St. George Church Wadel is a Church in Vypin, Ernakulam District, Kerala, India. Built in 1849, the church has the highest number of priests and nuns in the Roman Catholic Archdiocese of Verapoly.

See also 
Roman Catholic Archdiocese of Verapoly

References

Roman Catholic churches in Kochi